The Cadillac ATS (short for Alpha Touring Sedan) is a compact premium 4-door sedan and 2-door coupe manufactured and marketed by Cadillac and developed at the General Motors Technical Center in Warren, Michigan. Cadillac assembles the ATS at the Lansing Grand River Assembly plant in Lansing, Michigan.

The ATS is based on General Motors' Alpha platform and is offered in either rear- or all-wheel drive configurations. The ATS base engine had been a naturally aspirated 2.5-liter I-4 gasoline engine that produces , until the 2016 model year. Optional engines include a 2.0-liter turbocharged I-4 gasoline engine that produces  and a naturally aspirated 3.6-liter V6 gasoline engine that produces . The 2.0-liter engine replaced the 2.5-liter engine as the base engine for the 2017 model year. A diesel engine had been planned to be available in the future. All versions were equipped with a 6-speed GM 6L45 Hydra-Matic automatic transmission as standard until the 2015 model year. An 8-speed automatic transmission was introduced for the 2016 model year. The 2.0-liter turbocharged, rear-wheel drive version can be mated to an optional 6-speed Tremec M3L TR-3160 manual transmission.

Cadillac debuted the ATS to the press in the United States in January 2012, placed the ATS into production in July 2012 and began selling the ATS in the United States in August 2012 as a 2013 model. GM began selling the ATS in China in November 2013. Cadillac sold the ATS in the U.S., Canada, Mexico, Europe, the Middle East, China, Japan, and South Korea, until it was replaced by the CT4 in 2019 and 2020.

Development
GM engineers working principally at the General Motors Technical Center in Warren, Michigan, United States developed the ATS.

Rationale
Prior to the debut of the ATS, Cadillac's smallest vehicle was the mid-size CTS. The CTS was comparable in price to compact competitors like the Audi A4, the BMW 3 Series, the Lexus IS and the Mercedes-Benz C-Class but was comparable in size and weight to the more expensive mid-size BMW 5 Series. Although Cadillac believed that customers would favor a 5 Series sized car at a 3 Series price, that assumption proved to be incorrect. Cadillac's research found that target customers who already owned vehicles like the 3 Series or A4 did not want a larger vehicle. General Motors began development of a smaller car that would satisfy these target customers; that car would eventually become the Cadillac ATS.

Competitive benchmarking
To establish parameters around which they would design the ATS, GM engineers benchmarked the 1999-2006 BMW E46 3 Series, which ATS chief engineer Dave Masch and his team regarded as the most dynamic and driver-focused iteration of the 3 Series. The engineers emphasized low weight when developing the ATS and their efforts resulted in a finished vehicle that weighs less than the BMW E46 benchmark. To achieve this result, Masch suggested that the engineering team disregarded certain GM product development rules that, had they been followed, would have resulted in a heavier vehicle.

Marketing

Cadillac showed a pre-production styling buck of the ATS to the press on 11 August 2009. Cadillac debuted the production ATS to the press on 8 January 2012. General Motors began selling the ATS in the United States in August 2012 as a 2013 model. Sales in China began on 21 November 2013. Chinese-market vehicles were initially imported from the United States by Shanghai GM.  A Chinese-assembled ATS-L was launched in China in August 2014.

New platform and minor refresh for 2015
During the early development of the ATS, GM engineers determined that downsizing the GM Sigma II platform that underpinned the second-generation CTS would result in a vehicle that was too heavy and that using an economical, front-wheel drive platform would sacrifice performance. Under the leadership of Dave Leone, GM engineers created a brand-new platform which was designed to be light and compact, to be capable of handling both rear- and all-wheel drive configurations and to have a near 50/50 weight distribution. The new platform developed by the GM engineers for the ATS is now called the GM Alpha platform.

For 2015 model year, the refreshed Cadillac ATS gained most of its styling from its Coupe version, the two-bar grille, redesigned Cadillac emblem, seen on the ATS coupe first, and was eventually placed on every Cadillac in the lineup by 2017. Exterior tweaks for the 2015 Cadillac ATS front fascia has been lowered, and more exterior paint choices have been made. The ATS interior is a carryover for 2015, but has seen some modest technology updates for 2015 as well including a more responsive CUE system.

2016 model year changes
For the 2016 model year, the new generation 3.6L LGX V6 featuring a cylinder deactivation system replaces the 3.6L LFX V6 and a new 8-speed 8L45 replaces the 6-speed 6L45 automatic transmission. As opposed to the previous years of the ATS's more lower-placed emblems, the rear emblems were now placed near the top of the trunk lid. Automatic start-stop technology was added for the 2.0T and 3.6L V6 models using the 8-speed automatic transmission. GM claimed this ultracapacitor-based system reduced  output by 6 percent. In addition to a refreshed gauge cluster using white LEDs and added chrome, Apple CarPlay and Android Auto were also made standard starting with the 2016 model year.

2017 model year changes 
A Carbon Black sport package, which blacks out chrome and adds body colored door handles and spoiler, two exterior colors and 17-inch wheels in two finishes are new for 2017 in addition to optional Recaro seats, complementing the Cadillac signature exterior and interior design.

Assembly
General Motors assembles the ATS at the Lansing Grand River Assembly plant in Lansing, Michigan, United States. GM spent US$190 million to upgrade the Lansing Grand River Assembly plant for ATS production and hired a second shift of workers. GM began assembling vehicles intended for sale to customers on 26 July 2012.

The Chinese-market ATS-L is assembled by SAIC-GM in Shanghai.

Specifications
The ATS is a compact four-door, five-passenger sedan. A two-door coupe went on sale in summer 2014 as a 2015 model. Convertible and station wagon variants are expected to be produced, although Cadillac has not yet confirmed those body styles.

The 2013 ATS ranged in price from US$34,000 to US$52,000, about US$1,800 less expensive than the entry level 2012 BMW 328i. The 2014 ATS ranges in price from US$33,065 - US$58,760.

The hood, front suspension and cradle are made from aluminum. The front suspension is a MacPherson strut, double-pivot set up, using a pair of ball joints and lower control links. Third-generation Magnetic Ride Control active suspension is optional on the Premium RWD variant. A mechanical limited-slip differential is standard with the manual transmission variant and is an available on the premium automatic.

Powertrains
The ATS is available in either a rear- or all wheel drive layout, has four available engines and two available transmissions.

Engines
From 2013 to 2016, the ATS base engine in the U.S. model was a naturally aspirated 2.5-liter inline-four engine (LCV) that produces . As of 2017, the base engine is a 2.0-liter turbocharged I4 gasoline engine (LTG) that produces , which was optional in previous years. A naturally aspirated 3.6-liter V6 gasoline engine (LGX) that produces  is optional. 2013 to 2015 ATS models had an available 3.6-liter LFX V6 gasoline engine. GM has committed to offering a diesel engine for the ATS, but has not specified an availability date.

EPA estimated fuel economy

Transmissions
All versions of the ATS were equipped with a 6-speed GM 6L45 Hydra-Matic automatic transmission as standard until the 2015 model year. The 2.0-liter turbo, rear-wheel drive version can be mated to an optional 6-speed Tremec M3L TR-3160 manual transmission.

The 2016 model year ATS replaces all uses of the 6-speed 6L45 with the new 8-speed 8L45 automatic transmission.

For China, 2014 and 2015 models used the GM 6T70 gearbox. The GM 8L45 gearbox replaced it for 2016 models onwards.

Trim levels

In North America, at the time of the model's introduction, the 2013 ATS was available in four trim levels: Standard, Luxury, Performance and Premium.

In China, at the time of the model's introduction, the ATS is available in five exterior colors and two interior colors over four trim levels: Standard, Luxury, Elite and Comfort.

ATS Coupe

The 2015 Cadillac ATS Coupe debuted at the 2014 Detroit Auto Show. The two door Cadillac targets Mercedes-Benz C-Class Coupe and the BMW 4 Series. It went on sale in the summer of 2014 as the 2015 Cadillac ATS Coupe. The ATS coupe is wider than the sedan. Two models were available at launch. Buyers have a choice of six-speed manual or a six-speed automatic transmission, and the option of all wheel drive or standard rear wheel drive. The 2015 Cadillac ATS Coupe is the first production model to wear Cadillac's newly revised brand logo without its previous laurel wreath, and was first shown on the Cadillac Elmiraj concept car. The ATS coupe received 4G LTE connectivity with a WiFi hotspot, CUE interface with Siri Eyes Free, and a Bose stereo with 12 speakers. GM discontinued the Cadillac ATS Coupe after the 2019 model year without any replacement planned due to poor sales and the growing popularity of GM's crossovers and SUVs. However, the sedan version of the ATS was replaced by the Cadillac CT4 sedan for the 2020 model year.

ATS-L

In July 2014, Cadillac announced that it would be producing a long wheelbase version of the ATS for the Chinese market known as the ATS-L. The ATS-L has a wheelbase 85 mm (3.3 in) longer than the standard ATS sedan and will be manufactured in China by Shanghai GM.

Previous ATS vehicles had been imported to China from GM's Lansing manufacturing facility in Michigan. The ATS-L has a starting price of 270,000 Chinese Yuan, or about $43,600 US dollars. The 2 litre LTG turbocharged petrol engine is standard across the range producing 230 and 279 horsepower. The ATS-L previously ran on the GM 6T70 automatic gearbox for 2014 and 2015 and used the GM 8L45 automatic gearbox from 2016 to 2019. Trim levels are known as the 25T and 28T. Production ended in September 2019.

ATS-L Sales

ATS-V

The Cadillac ATS-V is a high performance version of the Cadillac ATS, similar to how the CTS-V is to the standard CTS model. The ATS-V series includes two body styles, which feature a turbocharged DOHC V-6 engine and a sport-tuned suspension. The ATS-V sedan and coupe were introduced for the 2016 model year.

Motor Trend conducted a comparison between the BMW M3, ATS-V, and Mercedes-AMG C63-S. The Cadillac managed to accelerate faster than both German vehicles and was the fastest around Willow Springs International Motorsports Park; it was also the least expensive in the test.

Cadillac competed at the Pirelli World Challenge from 2015 to 2017 with the Cadillac ATS-V.R, a racecar based on the ATS-V under the GT3 regulations, developed in collaboration with Pratt & Miller. Johnny O'Connell won the championship in 2015, finished fourth in 2016 and sixth in 2017. In addition, Michael Cooper finished third in 2016 and second in 2017.

Safety
Testing conducted by the United States National Highway Traffic and Safety Administration scored the 2013 and 2014 ATS, in both rear- and all-wheel drive variants, at five stars in frontal crash, side crash and rollover protection, resulting in five stars overall, the highest possible score. The NHTSA notes the availability of three NHTSA recommended technologies on the ATS: electronic stability control, forward collision warning and lane departure warning.

Awards
In 2012, the 2013 ATS was chosen as "Car of the Year" by Esquire, "Luxury Car of the Year" by Popular Mechanics magazine and "Vehicle of the Year" by the Motor Press Guild.

In 2013, a jury composed of 49 journalists from the United States and Canada named the 2013 ATS the North American Car of the Year.

Sales

References

External links

 

ATS
All-wheel-drive vehicles
Cars introduced in 2012
Compact executive cars
Coupés
Rear-wheel-drive vehicles
Sports sedans